Jack Ma Yun (born 10 September 1964) is a Chinese business magnate, investor and philanthropist. He is the co-founder of Alibaba Group, a multinational technology conglomerate. In addition, Ma is also the co-founder of Yunfeng Capital, a Chinese private equity firm. As of January 2023, with a net worth of $34.1 billion, Ma is the fifth-wealthiest person in China (after Zhong Shanshan, Zhang Yiming, Ma Huateng and Robin Zeng), as well as the 34th wealthiest person in the world, ranked by Bloomberg Billionaires Index. 

Born in Hangzhou, Zhejiang, Ma earned a Bachelor of Art's degree with a major in English upon graduating from Hangzhou Normal University in 1988. He became an English lecturer and international trade lecturer at Hangzhou Dianzi University following graduation. Later taking an interest in the emergence of the internet business, he established his first business in 1994, only to end up forming a second company after learning more about the internet and the commercial business possibilities that could be potentially exploited from its emerging growth. From 1998 to 1999, he led an information technology company founded by the Chinese government, later leaving it to start the Alibaba Group with his colleagues in 1999. The company was initially founded as B2B e-commerce marketplace website, yet the company later expanded into a wide range of industry domains across the Chinese economy, including e-commerce, high-technology, and online payment solutions.

In 2017, Ma was ranked second in the annual "World's 50 Greatest Leaders" list by Fortune. He has widely been considered as an informal global ambassador in Chinese business circles, and has continued to remain an influential figure in the Chinese business community and scene of startup companies. In September 2018, he announced that he would retire from Alibaba and pursue educational work, philanthropy, and environmental causes; the following year, Daniel Zhang succeeded him as executive chairman. In 2020, the Chinese government stopped plans for an IPO called for the digital payment solutions company Ant Group, a company that he founded after he delivered a speech that criticized Chinese financial regulators for putting too much priority in minimizing risk.

In 2019, Forbes named Ma in its list of "Asia's 2019 Heroes of Philanthropy" for his humanitarian and philanthropic work supporting underprivileged communities in China, Africa, Australia, and the Middle East. In April 2021, Jack Ma ranked 26th in the "2021 Forbes Global Rich List" with a fortune of $48.4 billion USD.

Early life and education
Ma was born in Hangzhou, Zhejiang on September 11, 1964 as Ma Yun. He became interested in English as a young boy and began practicing with English speakers in the Hangzhou International Hotel. Ma's grandfather served as a security guard during the Second Sino-Japanese War. At the age of 12, Ma bought a pocket radio and began listening to English radio stations frequently. For nine years, Ma rode  on his bicycle every day to work as a tour guide of Hangzhou for foreigners in order to practice his English. He became pen pals with one of those foreigners, who nicknamed him "Jack" because he found it hard to pronounce his Chinese name. When Ma was 13 years old, he was forced to transfer to Hangzhou No. 8 Middle School as he kept getting caught in fights. In his early school days, Ma did not fare well scholastically, as it took two years for him to gain acceptance at an ordinary Chinese high school, as he only got 31 points in mathematics on the Chinese high school entrance exam. 

In 1982, at the age of 18, Ma failed the nation-wide Chinese college entrance exam, obtaining only 1 point in mathematics. Afterwards, he and his cousin applied to be  waiters at a nearby hotel. His cousin was hired, but Ma was rejected on the grounds that he was "too skinny, too short, and in general, protruded a bad physical appearance that may have potentially ended up hurting the restaurant's image and reputation." 

In 1983, Ma failed his college entrance exam again for the second time. However, his mathematics score improved, with Ma managing to obtain 19 points. In 1984, despite strong opposition from his family to persuade him to give up and pursue a different career path, Ma remained steadfastly determined as he decided to take the college entrance examination for the third time. This time, he scored 89 points in the mathematics section. However, the expected amount of marks as benchmark eligibility entrance requirements for prospective university undergraduates was standardized as five points above Ma's score. Since the enrollment target for English majors was not met, some prospective students had the opportunity to be accepted and promoted into the English major. Ma was promoted to the undergraduate foreign language major by Hangzhou Normal University. After entering Hangzhou Normal University, his academic performance improved substantially and Ma began to achieve scholarly excellence in his undergraduate studies and was consistently ranked as among the top five students in the university's foreign language department due to his extensive English-language skills. As a result of this, Ma was elected as the chairman of the student union, and later served as the chairman of the Hangzhou Federation of Students for two terms.

In 1988, Ma graduated with a Bachelor of Arts degree with a major in English. After graduation, he became a lecturer in English and international trade at Hangzhou Dianzi University. Ma also claims to have applied to Harvard Business School ten times consecutively, only to have ended up being rejected every time in spite of his persistent efforts.

Business career

Early career
According to Ma's autobiographical speech, after graduating from Hangzhou Normal University in 1988, Ma applied for 31 different odd entry-level jobs and was rejected for every single one. "I went for a job with the KFC; they said, 'you're no good, Ma told interviewer Charlie Rose. "I even went to KFC when it came to my city. Twenty-four people went for the job. Twenty-three were accepted. I was the only guy [rejected]...". During this period, China was nearing the end of its first decade following Deng Xiaoping's economic reforms.

In 1994, Ma heard about the Internet and also started his first company, Hangzhou Haibo Translation Agency, an online Chinese translation agency. In early 1995, he travelled abroad to the United States on behalf of the Hangzhou municipal government with fellow colleagues who had helped introduce him to the Internet. Although he found information related to beer from many countries, he was surprised to find none from China. He also tried to search for general information about China and again was surprised to find none. So he and his friend created an "ugly" website pertaining to information regarding Chinese beer. He launched the website at 9:40 AM, and by 12:30 PM he had received emails from prospective Chinese investors wishing to know more about him and his website. This was when Ma realized that the Internet had something great to offer. In April 1995, Ma and his business partner He Yibing (a computer instructor), opened the first office for China Pages, and Ma started their second company. On May 10, 1995, the pair registered the domain chinapages.com in the United States. Within a span of three years, China Pages cleared approximately 5,000,000 RMB in profit which at the time was equivalent to USD$642,998 (approximately $1.18 million today).

Ma began building websites for Chinese companies with the help of friends in the United States. He said that "The day we got connected to the Web, I invited friends and TV people over to my house", and on a very slow dial-up connection, "we waited three and a half hours and got half a page", he recalled. "We drank, watched TV and played cards, waiting. But I was so proud. I proved the Internet existed". At a conference in 2010, Ma revealed that despite achieving massive entrepreneurial success in the Chinese high-technology industry, he has never actually written a line of code nor made one sale to a customer and that he only acquired a computer for the first time at the age of 33. 

From 1998 to 1999, Ma headed an information technology company established by the China International Electronic Commerce Center, a department of the Ministry of Foreign Trade and Economic Cooperation. In 1999, he quit and returned to Hangzhou with his team to establish Alibaba, a Hangzhou-based business-to-business marketplace site in his apartment with a group of 18 friends. He started a new round of venture development with 500,000 yuan.

In October 1999 and January 2000, Alibaba won a total of a $25 million foreign venture seed capital from the American investment bank, Goldman Sachs and the Japanese investment management conglomerate SoftBank. The program was expected to improve the domestic Chinese e-commerce market and perfect an e-commerce platform for online Chinese enterprises to establish a presence for themselves to compete, especially fostering the growth of Chinese small and medium-sized enterprises (SMEs) as well as addressing challenges surrounding China's entrance into the World Trade Organization in 2001. Eventually, Alibaba began to show signs of profitability three years later as Ma wanted to improve the global e-commerce system. From 2003 onwards, Ma established Taobao Marketplace, Alipay, Ali Mama and Lynx. After the rapid rise of Taobao, American e-commerce giant eBay offered to purchase the company. However, Ma rejected their offer, instead garnering support from Yahoo co-founder Jerry Yang  who offered a $1 billion investment in upfront capital for the potential purpose of expanding Alibaba's corporate operations.

Chair of Alibaba Group

Since 1999, Ma served as the executive chairman of Alibaba Group, which has remined one of China's most prominent high-technology holding companies in the two decades since it inception presiding over nine major subsidiaries: Alibaba.com, Taobao Marketplace, Tmall, eTao, Alibaba Cloud Computing, Juhuasuan, 1688.com, AliExpress.com, and Alipay. At the annual general meeting of shareholders for Alibaba.com in May 2010, Ma announced Alibaba Group would begin in 2010 to earmark 0.3% of annual revenue to environmental protection, particularly on water- and air-quality improvement projects. Of the future of Alibaba, he has said, "our challenge is to help more people to make healthy money, 'sustainable money', money that is not only good for themselves but also good for the society. That's the transformation we are aiming to make."

In November 2012, Alibaba's online transaction volume exceeded one trillion yuan. Ma stepped down as the chief executive officer of Alibaba on 10 May 2013 but remained as the executive chairman of the corporation.In September 2014, it was reported Alibaba was raising over $25 billion in an initial public offering (IPO) on the New York Stock Exchange. , Ma is the owner of Château de Sours in Bordeaux, Chateau Guerry in Côtes de Bourg and Château Perenne in Blaye, Côtes de Bordeaux.

On January 9, 2017, Ma met with United States President-elect Donald Trump at Trump Tower, to discuss the potential of 1 million job openings in the following five years through the expansion of the presence of Alibaba's business interests in the United States. On 8 September 2017, to celebrate Alibaba's 18th year of establishment, Ma appeared on stage and gave a Michael-Jackson-inspired performance. He performed part of "Can You Feel The Love Tonight" at the 2009 Alibaba birthday event while dressed as a heavy metal lead singer. In the same month, Ma also partnered with Hong Kong business tycoon, Sir Li Ka-shing in a joint venture to offer a digital wallet service in Hong Kong.

Ma announced on September 10, 2018 that he would step down as executive chairman of Alibaba Group Holding in the coming year. Ma denied reports that he was forced to step aside by the Chinese government and stated that he wants to focus on philanthropy through his foundation. Daniel Zhang would then lead Alibaba as the current executive chairman. Ma stepped down from the board of Alibaba on 1 October 2020.

Disappearance from the public eye
News outlets noted a lack of public appearances from Ma between October 2020 and January 2021, coinciding with a regulatory crackdown on his businesses. The Financial Times reported that the disappearance may have been connected to a speech given at the annual People's Bank of China financial markets forum, in which Ma criticized China's regulators and banks. In November 2020, the Financial Times reported the abrupt cancellation of the Ant Group's anticipated initial public offering (IPO) after an intervention by financial regulators. According to Chinese bankers and officials, financial stability was the objective behind the intervention. Some commentators speculated that Ma may have been a victim of forced disappearance, while others speculated that he could be voluntarily lying low. 

Ma made a public appearance again on 20 January 2021, speaking via video link to a group of rural teachers at a charitable event, the annual Rural Teacher Initiative. 

In February 2021, Bloomberg reported that he was seen golfing at the Sun Valley Golf Resort in the Chinese island of Hainan. 

In March 2021, Ma and Alibaba were ordered by Chinese regulators to sell off certain media companies, including Hong Kong's South China Morning Post, as part of a Chinese campaign to curb the influence wielded by giant digital conglomerates. 

In October 2021, Reuters reported Ma was on the Spanish island of Mallorca shopping at a local store. His superyacht was anchored in the Port of Andratx. 

In November 2022, Ma was reportedly living a low profile life in Tokyo, Japan, for nearly six months, and occasionally traveling abroad.

Entertainment career 
In 2017, Ma made his acting debut with his first kung fu short film Gong Shou Dao. It was filmed in collaboration with the Double 11 Shopping Carnival Singles' Day. In the same year, he also participated in a singing festival and performed dances during Alibaba's 18th-anniversary party.

In November 2020, in the finale of Africa’s Business Heroes, Ma was replaced as a judge in the television show, with Alibaba executive Peng Lei taking his place, reportedly "Due to a schedule conflict".

Awards and honors
 In 2004, Ma was honored as one of the "Top 10 Economic Personalities of the Year" by China Central Television (CCTV).
 In September 2005, the World Economic Forum selected Ma as a "Young Global Leader". 
 Fortune also selected him as one of the "25 Most Powerful Businesspeople in Asia" in 2005. 
 Businessweek also selected him as a "Businessperson of the Year" in 2007.
 In 2008, Barron's featured him as one of the 30 "World's Best CEOs"
 In May 2009, Time magazine listed Ma as one of the world's 100 most powerful people. In reporting Ma's accomplishments, Adi Ignatius, former Time senior editor and editor-in-chief of the Harvard Business Review, noted that "the Chinese Internet entrepreneur is soft-spoken and elf-like—and he speaks really good English" and remarked that "Taobao.com, Mr. Ma's consumer-auction website, conquered eBay in China." He was also included in this list in 2014.
 BusinessWeek chose him as one of China's Most Powerful People. 
 Forbes China also selected him as one of the Top 10 Most Respected Entrepreneurs in China by in 2009. Ma received the 2009 CCTV Economic Person of the Year: Business Leaders of the Decade Award.
 In 2010, Ma was selected by Forbes Asia as one of Asia's Heroes of Philanthropy for his contribution to disaster relief and poverty.
 In 2011, it was announced that one of his companies had gained control of Alipay, formerly a subsidiary of Alibaba Group, so as to "comply with Chinese law governing payment companies in order to secure a license to continue operating Alipay. 
 Numerous analysts reported that Ma sold Alipay to himself below market value without notifying the board of Alibaba Group or the other major owners Yahoo and Softbank, while Ma stated that Alibaba Group's board of directors were aware of the transaction. The ownership dispute was resolved by Alibaba Group, Yahoo! and Softbank in July 2011.
 Ma was awarded an honorary doctoral degree by the Hong Kong University of Science and Technology in November 2013.
 Ma was a board member of Japan's SoftBank (2007–2020) and China's Huayi Brothers Media Corporation. He became a trustee of The Nature Conservancy's China program in 2009 and joined its global board of directors in April 2010. 
 In 2013, he became chairman of the board for The Nature Conservancy's China Program; this was one day after he stepped down from Alibaba as company CEO. 
 In 2014, he was ranked as the 30th-most-powerful person in the world in an annual ranking published by Forbes.
 In 2015, Asian Award honoured him with the Entrepreneur of the Year award.
 In 2016, he was awarded the Chevalier of the French Legion of Honour by French Minister of Foreign Affairs and International Development Laurent Fabius.
 In 2017, Fortune ranked Ma second on its World's 50 Greatest Leaders list.
 In 2017, a KPMG survey ranked Ma third in global tech innovation visionary survey.
 In October 2017, Ma was given an honorary degree of Doctor of Science in Technopreneurship from De La Salle University Manila, Philippines.
 In May 2018, Ma was given an honorary degree of Doctor of Social Sciences by the University of Hong Kong in recognition of his contributions to technology, society and the world.
 In May 2018, Ma received an honorary doctorate from professors Yaakov Frenkel and Yaron Oz at the Tel Aviv University.
In May 2019, Ma and other 16 influential global figures were appointed by Secretary-General of the United Nations as the new advocates for sustainable development goals.
 In July 2020, Ma received from King Abdullah II a first class medal for his contribution in fighting back against the COVID-19 pandemic.
 In August 2020, Ma was to receive from the President of Pakistan a Hilal e Quaid e Azam medal for his contribution in fighting back against the COVID-19 pandemic.

Views
Ma is a adherent of both Buddhism and Taoism.

On September 24 2014, in an interview with Taobao, Ma attributed the strength of American society, due to the country rooted in its Judeo-Christian heritage, and expressed his belief in the importance for China to implement a positive value system, in order to overcome the aftermath and legacy of the bygone Cultural Revolution.

In November 2018, the People's Daily identified Ma as a member of the Chinese Communist Party, something which surprised observers.

Ma received international criticism after he publicly endorsed the Chinese work practice known as the 996 working hour system. When asked in 2019 to give his views on the future, Ma again stated that 996 was currently a "huge blessing" necessary to achieve success, but went on to state that artificial intelligence technology might lead to a better life of leisure in the future, where people would only have to work four-hour work days, three days a week. At the same time, Ma expressed skepticism that AI could ever completely replace people, referencing to his theory that success requires a "love quotient" and stating that machines can never match this success. Ma also predicted that population collapse would become a big problem in the future.

Philanthropy 

Jack Ma is the founder of the Jack Ma Foundation, a philanthropic organization focused on improving education, the environment and public health.

In 2008, Alibaba donated $808,000 to victims of the Sichuan earthquake. In 2009 Jack Ma became a trustee of The Nature Conservancy's China program, and in 2010 he joined the global Board of Directors of the organization.

In 2015, Alibaba launched a nonprofit organization, Alibaba Hong Kong Young Entrepreneurs Foundation, which supports Hong Kong entrepreneurs to help them grow their businesses. In the same year, the company funded the rebuilding of 1,000 houses damaged by the earthquake-hit in Nepal, and raised money for another 9,000.
In 2015 he also founded the Hupan School, a business school.

In September 2018 Ma started the Jack Ma Foundation and announced that he would retire from Alibaba to pursue educational work, philanthropy, and environmental causes.

In 2019, Forbes named Ma in its list of "Asia's 2019 Heroes of Philanthropy" and awarded him the Malcolm S. Forbes Lifetime Achievement Award for his work supporting underprivileged communities in China, Africa, Australia, and the Middle East.

In 2020, in response to the COVID-19 pandemic, the Alibaba Foundation and Jack Ma Foundation launched various initiatives, some of which involved donating medical supplies to the United States as well as various countries in Asia, Africa, and Europe.

Notes

References

External links

Leadership biographies at Alibaba Group

Biography at The Nature Conservancy (Board of Directors)

 
1964 births
Living people
20th-century Chinese businesspeople
21st-century Chinese businesspeople
Alibaba Group people
Asia Game Changer Award winners
Billionaires from Zhejiang
Businesspeople from Hangzhou
Businesspeople in information technology
Businesspeople in online retailing
Chevaliers of the Légion d'honneur
Chinese Buddhists
Chinese chief executives
Chinese computer businesspeople
Chinese football chairmen and investors
Chinese investors
Chinese online retailer founders
Chinese schoolteachers
Chinese Taoists
Chinese technology company founders
Enforced disappearances in China
Educators from Hangzhou
Hangzhou Normal University alumni
Private equity and venture capital investors
World Economic Forum Young Global Leaders